Persatuan Sepak Bola Indonesia Purbalingga, commonly known as Persibangga Purbalingga, or Persibangga, is an Indonesian football club based in Purbalingga, Central Java. They currently compete in Liga 3.

Players

Current squad

Coaching staff

Honours
Liga Indonesia First Division
Runners-up (1): 2011-12
Liga Indonesia Second Division
Champions (1): 2010-11

References

External links
Official site
 

Football clubs in Indonesia
Football clubs in Central Java
Association football clubs established in 1954
1954 establishments in Indonesia